Lipocosma diabata is a moth in the family Crambidae. It is found in North America, where it has been recorded from Florida.

References

Glaphyriinae
Moths described in 1917